"Sexy in Latin" was the fifth single to be released by Little Man Tate. It was released on 22 January 2007, one week before their debut album About What You Know. The single became their first top 20 single, on Sunday 28 January 2007 when it reached number 20 in the UK Singles Chart.

Track listings 

CD
 "Sexy in Latin"
 "Balko's Barren Patch"

7" vinyl
 "Sexy in Latin" (acoustic)
 "Half Empty Glass" (acoustic)

7" vinyl, limited edition
 "Sexy in Latin"
 "She's Become So Special"

Download
 "Sexy in Latin" (live in Amsterdam)
 "Sexy in Latin" (live at the Boardwalk)

References

2007 singles
Little Man Tate (band) songs
2007 songs
V2 Records singles